Phyllonorycter bifurcata is a moth of the family Gracillariidae. It is known from the islands of Kyūshū, Shikoku and Tusima in Japan.

The wingspan is about 5.5 mm.

The larvae feed on Celtis jessoensis and Celtis sinensis. They mine the leaves of their host plant.

References

bifurcata
Moths of Japan

Taxa named by Tosio Kumata
Moths described in 1967
Leaf miners